Star Music (stylized in lowercase as starmusic; formerly known as Star Records), is a record label in the Philippines owned and operated by media conglomerate ABS-CBN Corporation. It was formerly a separate company operating as a wholly owned subsidiary of ABS-CBN until 2013 when it was merged to ABS-CBN Film Productions, Inc. It is now a division of ABS-CBN Music, a division of ABS-CBN for its music. Its publishing and distribution subsidiary in the country is Star Music Publishing (formerly Star Songs, Inc.) and has over one thousand songs in its catalog including the classic song "Anak" by Freddie Aguilar.

It is a member of the Philippine Association of the Record Industry (PARI), a non-profit and private trade organization, that represents the recording industry distributors in the Philippines.

Star Music also released video karaoke VCDs versions of the label's songs in the Philippines.

History

Star Music was founded on February 20, 1995, as Star Recording, Inc. with Star Records as its label. The record label was created by ABS-CBN Corporation to diversify its functions from a broadcast media to a full entertainment company. Commercial operations of the label started in September 1995, signing an exclusive distribution agreement with Sony Music Entertainment Philippines in the entire country, except in Metro Manila. Due to its distribution agreement with Sony, Star Records endured problems with distributing titles in Metro Manila. In August 1996, the record label engage into licensing deals in order to strengthen its production base and gain entry into the Metro Manila market. It first signed a 3-year license agreement with JML Records, a local rock label. The deal enabled the label to gain control of its catalogue of 30 titles. Later, Star Records signed deals with foreign-independent labels such as Beaver Music of the Netherlands, Music of Life of the United Kingdom, and Rox of Belgium.

In October 1996, Star Records renewed its licensing deal with Sony which also includes 30 dealerships in Metro Manila. The deal enabled the label to get a significant presence in Metro Manila's market. By December of the same year, the label's number of signed artists increased to twenty artists. In June 1997, Star Records signed a distribution and licensing agreement with Taiwan's Rock Records, which also involved products from about forty independent European and American labels. Also under this deal, albums by named international artists helped improved Star Records' market profile.

In March 2005, responding to Perceptions Inc.'s Tara Na, Biyahe Tayo, Star Records teamed up with the Philippine Tourism Authority (now the Tourism Infrastructure and Enterprise Zone Authority) for an all-star version of their Pilipino Sa Turismo'y Aktibo tourism anthem which featured most of the label's artists such as Gary Valenciano, Jamie Rivera, Ai-Ai delas Alas, Vhong Navarro, Piolo Pascual, Erik Santos, Gloc-9, Sheryn Regis and Heart Evangelista, with additional speech by some of ABS-CBN's biggest stars at that time including Jericho Rosales, Kris Aquino, Claudine Barretto, Jiro Manio and Charo Santos-Concio. However, the song's lack of extensive support by the mother network led to its obscurity.

In 2007, Star Records launched Acel, the former vocalist of the rock band Moonstar88, as the country's first digital artist. By 2015, the record label celebrates its 20th anniversary.

In 2013, Star Recording, Inc. and Star Songs, Inc. were both merged to ABS-CBN Film Productions. In 2014, it changed its name to Star Music. In the same year, they launched their very own music downloading website. This is also the time where Star Music started to release their songs on iTunes, Spotify, and other music downloading and streaming websites and applications. They also revamped their YouTube channel as a response to the current trend in the consumption of music and video contents on the internet.

In September 2015, Star Music acquired the copyrights to around 116 original compositions of Tito Sotto, Vic Sotto and Joey de Leon which includes songs popularized by 1970s group VST & Co., Sharon Cuneta, and Nora Aunor, and popular songs such as "Ipagpatawad Mo", "Tayo'y Magsayawan" and "Awitin Mo, Isasayaw Ko."

On January 31, 2016, after 10 years, rapper Gloc-9 signed a record deal with Star Music, the record label who introduced Gloc-9 to mainstream listeners. Two of the most successful albums of Gloc-9, G9 and Ako Si... were released under Star Records in 2003 and 2005 respectively. These albums brought Gloc-9's biggest smash hits with songs like "Simpleng Tao" and "Hinahanap Ng Puso (feat. Hannah Romawac of Session Road)".

Sub-labels

Active
 Star Events - concerts and events organizer.
 Star Home Video
 Tarsier Records
 TNT Records - established in 2018 as the official record label of Tawag ng Tanghalan contenders, finalists, and champions.
 StarPop
 DNA Music
 Lodi Records
 Star Magic Records
 Old School Records

In addition, Star Music also distributes singles and albums/EPs of selected artists from  OneMusicPH, a digital music website owned by ABS-CBN Digital Media.

Defunct/Inactive
 ASAP Music – A sub-label for the television musical variety show ASAP. It was launched in 2006.
 Bituen Ti Amianan - a sub-label caters to the regional (northern) segment of the market.
 Black Bird Music – A sub-label; It is headed by Aiza Seguerra, which is also the label's founder.
 Budget Music - a sub-label for cover versions and multiplexes.
 Dream Music
 Ear Stab - a sub-label for rock and alternative artists.
 Istilo Records - a sub-label for young upcoming artists.
 NuGen Records – A sub label for independent and alternative artists.
 Premium Records
 Startraxx Records – a sub-label for film and television soundtracks.
 Saucy Music - a sub-label for mass-based artists.

Notable artists (past and present)

StarPop
 Alexa Ilacad
 Anji Salvacion
 Belle Mariano
 Charlie Dizon
 Gillian Vicencio
 Jordan Andrews
 KD Estrada

Tarsier Records
 Iñigo Pascual
 Kyla
 Marina Summers
 Sabine Cerrado (credited as SAB)
 KZ Tandingan
 Viñas Deluxe

DNA Music
 Nameless Kids
 Trisha Denise
 Kiss N Tell
 Ato Arman
 Dan Ombao

Old School Records
 RJZON
 Chloe Redondo
 Kevin Montillano (credited as KVN)

Discography

Notes

References

External links
Star Song Music Catalogue System

 
Entertainment companies of the Philippines
Philippine record labels
Record labels established in 1995
Assets owned by ABS-CBN Corporation
Star Cinema